The 1995–96 Belarusian Cup was the fifth season of the annual Belarusian football cup competition. Contrary to the league season, it is conducted in a fall-spring rhythm. It began on 4 August 1995 with the first of five rounds and ended on 17 May 1996 with the final at the Dinamo Stadium in Minsk.

FC Dinamo-93 Minsk were the defending champions, having defeated FC Torpedo Mogilev in the 1995 final, but were knocked out in the semifinal by FC Dinamo Minsk, the eventual finalists.

FC MPKC Mozyr won the final against FC Dinamo Minsk to win their first title.

Round of 32
The games were played on 4, 5 and 6 August 1995.

|}

Round of 16
The games were played on 31 August and 1 September 1995.

|}

Quarterfinals
The games were played on 22 October, 3 November 1995 and 28 April 1996.

|}

Semifinals
The games were played on 9 May 1996.

|}

Final
The final match was played on 17 May 1996 at the Dinamo Stadium in Minsk.

External links
 RSSSF

Belarusian Cup seasons
Belarusian Cup
Cup
Cup